Baglan Rugby Football Club is a Welsh rugby union team based in Baglan, Port Talbot, Wales, UK. The club is a member of the Welsh Rugby Union and is a feeder club for the Ospreys.

References

Welsh rugby union teams
Rugby union in Neath Port Talbot